Hilton Park has a number of different meanings:

 Hilton Park services, a Motorway Service Area on the M6 Motorway north of Wolverhampton, England. Named after Hilton Hall, the stately home in whose grounds it was built.
 Hilton Park (stadium), the former home ground for Leigh RMI and Leigh Centurions in Greater Manchester, England
 Hilton Park, Clones, County Monaghan, Ireland - a stately home
 Hilton Park, Dover, New Hampshire